Norberto Höfling (20 June 1924 – 18 April 2005) was a Romanian footballer and coach.

Playing career
Höfling began his career as professional footballer in Romania, being at his peak between 1945 and 1947 when he played for the national team of Romania and also for Carmen București, one of the best teams of that period of time.

He left the country in 1948 to play for MTK Budapest and then he followed the route: Lazio Roma, Pro Patria Calcio, ending his career at Vicenza Calcio.

Coaching career
At the age of 33, in 1957, Höfling started his career as football manager at Club Brugge. He left the club after six years, due to a dispute with Fernand Goyvaerts, then the star player of Club Brugge, to coach the Dutch team Feyenoord.

Being sacked from Feyenoord after only one year, Höfling returned to Belgium after he signed with R.W.D. Molenbeek, helping the team to win promotion into Belgian First Division.

In 1967, he rejoined Club Brugge. His second spell at the club was more successful than the first one, winning the Belgian Cup, before being signed by Anderlecht, only to be sacked after few months due to poor results.

A second spell at R.W.D. Molenbeek followed, but this time it was for a short period of time only, as he did not manage to win promotion in the top league, as he did with few years earlier when the team was called "Racing White".

In 1972, he signed with A.S. Oostende and in only two years he promoted the club from the third division to the top league. Again problems arose between him and the administration and the players that led to his retirement in 1976.

He then went to work at K.A.A. Gent before retiring in 1978.

He was 80 years of age when he died in Bruges, Belgium.

References

External links
 
 Norberto Höfling at enciclopediadelcalcio.com
 Biography at Club Brugge 

1924 births
2005 deaths
Sportspeople from Chernivtsi
Association football forwards
Romanian footballers
Jewish footballers
Jewish Romanian sportspeople
S.S. Lazio players
Romanian Jews
Maccabi București players
MTK Budapest FC players
Aurora Pro Patria 1919 players
L.R. Vicenza players
Serie A players
Serie B players
Romanian football managers
Romanian expatriate football managers
Club Brugge KV head coaches
R.S.C. Anderlecht managers
Eredivisie managers
K.A.A. Gent managers
Expatriate football managers in Belgium
Expatriate football managers in the Netherlands
Expatriate football managers in Italy
Romanian expatriate footballers
Expatriate footballers in Italy
Romanian expatriate sportspeople in Italy
Expatriate footballers in Hungary
Romanian expatriate sportspeople in Hungary
Romanian expatriate sportspeople in Belgium
Romanian expatriate sportspeople in the Netherlands